The 8th Reconnaissance Regiment (14th Canadian Hussars), commonly abbreviated to 8 Recce, VIII Recce or (within the British Army) 8 Canadian Recce, was the reconnaissance arm of the 2nd Canadian Infantry Division during World War II. The core of the regiment was formed from the militia unit the 14th Canadian Hussars.

Formation and structure 

8 Recce was formed at Guillemont Barracks, near Aldershot in southern England, on March 11, 1941, by merging three existing squadrons within the division.  Its first commanding officer was Lieutenant-Colonel Churchill C. Mann.  Mann was succeeded as commanding officer on September 26, 1941, by Lieutenant-Colonel P. A. Vokes, who was in turn followed on February 18, 1944, by Lieutenant-Colonel M. A. Alway.  The last commanding officer was Major "Butch" J. F. Merner, appointed to replace Alway a couple of months before the end of the fighting in Europe.

8 Recce had its roots in the 14th Canadian Light Horse, a militia unit formed in 1920. One source claims the unit was the union of the 27th Light Horse and the 14th Canadian Mounted Rifles, but the official lineage shows no amalgamation in 1920, just a renaming of the 27th Light Horse. Authoritative lists of units in the Active Militia and the Canadian Expeditionary Force show no record of a "14th Canadian Mounted Rifles" – there were only 13 regiments of mounted rifles organized in the CEF.  In any event, the 14th Canadian Light Horse in the 1920s was headquartered in Swift Current, Saskatchewan.  It comprised 'A', 'B' and 'C' Squadrons based at Swift Current, Swift Current and Shuanavon, respectively.  In 1937 the regiment was designated a mechanized unit, and in 1940 the regiment was renamed the 14th Canadian Hussars.  In 1941 an Active Service regiment was mobilized, and its members joined with other reconnaissance personnel in England to form 8 Recce.

Following the pattern used in the Reconnaissance Corps of the British Army, 8 Recce was composed of a regimental headquarters (officially 26 men of all ranks at full strength), one headquarters squadron (222 men of all ranks) and three reconnaissance squadrons identified by the letters 'A', 'B' and 'C' (191 men each of all ranks).  The Headquarters Squadron contained a squadron headquarters (6 men), an administrative troop (44 men), a signal troop (40 men), an anti-aircraft troop (9 men), an anti-tank troop (79 men) and a mortar troop (44 men).

Each of the three reconnaissance squadrons was composed of a squadron headquarters (36 men), three scout troops (38 men each) and one assault troop (41 men).  The 12 troops in the reconnaissance squadrons were numbered, with Troops 1 to 4 in 'A' Squadron, Troops 5 to 8 in 'B' Squadron, and Troops 9 to 12 in 'C' Squadron.  Troops 4, 8 and 12 were the assault troops.  A reconnaissance squadron was commanded by a major assisted by a captain.

A scout troop comprised one reconnaissance section and two carrier sections.   Each scout troop (38 men of all ranks) would usually be commanded by a lieutenant assisted by a second lieutenant. An assault troop (about 41 men of all ranks) contained four assault sections (8 men each).  Each assault troop was commanded by a lieutenant assisted by a sergeant.

The nominal strength of the regiment was 42 officers, 71 non-commissioned officers and 708 other ranks for a total of 821 men of all ranks.

Primary mission, weapons and equipment 

The primary mission of 8 Recce was to provide reconnaissance capabilities for the 2nd Canadian Infantry Division.  Reconnaissance involves determining the location and capabilities of enemy units, and providing current information concerning the state of the theatre of operations (e.g., road and bridge conditions, alternative lines of advance).  Weak enemy positions might be attacked if the opportunity arose, but strong-points are generally bypassed and left for assault units to tackle.  Nevertheless, determining the position and strength of the rear guard of a retreating enemy, or the location and strength of newly established defence lines, will frequently draw fire and provoke combat situations.  Unless the enemy is retreating in especially disorganized fashion, a lightly armoured reconnaissance unit is vulnerable to land mines and ambushes. Consequently 8 Recce, along with other reconnaissance battalions, had significant assault capabilities to allow it to rescue pinned down scout units.

After its formation in England, 8 Recce was equipped initially with BSA M20 motorcycles, 15-cwt and 3-ton Canadian Military Pattern trucks, the light Fox Armoured Car, automatic weapons and radio communication equipment.  The equipment was upgraded progressively during the three years of training in England to include more heavily armed armoured cars and a variety of weapons systems in response to the combat experience of other reconnaissance regiments in the Reconnaissance Corps.  During the campaign to liberate northern France, Belgium and the Netherlands, the primary scouting vehicles of 8 Recce were the Mark IIIA Humber Armoured Car as well as the (from October 1944 onward) Daimler Armoured Cars.  Although the ruggedness and speed of these lightly armoured wheeled vehicles was ideal for the reconnaissance role during the campaign across Northwest Europe, they were vulnerable to German antitank weapons, such as the 75-mm and 88-mm guns. Other major weapons deployed by 8 Recce included the Universal Gun Carrier, the M5 half-track, 2-inch light mortars, 3-inch mortars, 6-pounder anti-tank guns, PIAT portable anti-tank weapons, and heavy machine guns.

Toward the end of the war each scout troop was equipped with five armoured cars (three Daimlers and two Humbers) and seven Universal Gun Carriers (each mounted with one American 0.5 inch (12.7mm) M2 Browning machine gun heavy machine gun, replacing the original 0.303 (7.7mm) Bren light machine gun). Each assault troop was equipped with five half-tracks, each carrying one .50-calibre heavy machine gun.

In accordance with the system of vehicle markings used by the British Army, the vehicles of 8 Recce were identified as belonging to a reconnaissance unit by the presence of a square "unit mark" containing the number 41 in white on top of a two-tone, green above blue background.

Action during World War II 

8 Recce spent the first three years of its existence involved in training and coastal defence duties in southern England.  It was not involved in the ill-fated Dieppe Raid on August 19, 1942, and thus avoided the heavy losses suffered that day by many other units of the 2nd Canadian Infantry Division.  The regiment landed with its division in Normandy on July 6, 1944, one month after D-Day, and first entered combat as infantry in the ongoing Battle of Normandy.  The regiment's first three combat deaths occurred on July 13, two of which when a shell struck a slit trench sheltering two men near Le Mesnil. Another Trooper was killed during the Battle of Caen the same day from a mortar shell.

Following the near-destruction of the German Seventh Army and Fifth Panzer Army in the Falaise Pocket in August 1944, the remaining German forces were compelled into a rapid fighting retreat out of Northern France and much of Belgium.  8 Recce provided the reconnaissance function for its division during the advance of the First Canadian Army eastward out of Normandy, up to and across the Seine River, and then along the coastal regions of northern France and Belgium.  The regiment was involved in spearheading the liberation of the port cities of Dieppe and Antwerp; it was also involved in the investment of Dunkirk, which was then left under German occupation until the end of war.  8 Recce saw heavy action through to the end of the war including the costly Battle of the Scheldt, the liberation of the Netherlands and the invasion of Germany.

An early demonstration of the mobility and power of the armoured cars of 8 Recce occurred during the liberation of Orbec in Normandy.  Over August 21 to 23, the infantry of the 2nd Canadian Infantry Division had succeeded in pushing eastward up to the west bank of the River Tourques, but they were unable to expand an initial bridgehead across the river because of the presence of enemy positions in Orbec on the east bank.  Humbers of 8 Recce had meanwhile scouted out possible river crossings northwest of the town.  They succeeded in crossing the Tourques, then circled back to Orbec and attacked the German defenders unexpectedly from the north and east.  Enemy resistance in the town was rapidly overcome and the division's advance towards the Seine could resume.

The reconnaissance role of 8 Recce often put its members well ahead of the main body of the division, especially during the pursuit of the retreating German army across northern France and Belgium in late August and September 1944.  For example, elements of 8 Recce entered Dieppe on the morning of September 1, 1944, scene of the disastrous Dieppe Raid of 1942, a full 12 hours before the arrival of truck-borne Canadian infantry.  The liberation of Dieppe was facilitated by the withdrawal of the German occupying forces on the previous day. The unexpectedly early liberation allowed a planned and likely devastating Allied bombing raid on the city to be called off.  8 Recce was responsible for liberating many other towns in the campaign across Northwest Europe.

During the Battle of the Scheldt, 8 Recce advanced westwards and cleared the southern bank of the West Scheldt river. In one notable action, armoured cars of 'A' Squadron were ferried across the river; on the other side the cars then proceeded to liberate the island of North Beveland by November 2, 1944. Bluff played an important role in this operation. The German defenders had been warned that they would be attacked by ground support aircraft on their second low-level pass if they did not surrender immediately. Shortly thereafter 450 Germans surrendered after their positions were buzzed by 18 Typhoons.  Unbeknownst to the Germans, the Typhoons would not have been able to fire on their positions since the aircraft's munitions were already committed to another operation.

Shortly after midnight on the night 6–7 February 1945 (Haps, Holland), when 11 and 12 troops of C Sqn. patrolled and contacted each other and started back - 11 troop patrol was challenged with halt from, the ditch. L/Cpl. Bjarne Tangen fired a sten magazine into the area from which the challenge came and then he and the others quickly took-up positions in the ditch, while the 3rd member of their patrol ran back and collected the 12 troop patrol, together with reinforcements from 12 troop and returned to the scene of firing. The evening ended with the patrol taking one German prisoner and one deceased. The German prisoner, Lt. Gunte Finke, was interrogated and he disclosed that he gave himself up after seeing the response of an estimated 30 men from the skirmish. The German intention was to verify information that armoured cars were in the area; not to bother with foot patrol or prisoners, but to attempt to "Bazooka one of our vehicles with the 2 Panzerfaust that their patrols carried". L/Cpl.Tangen was awarded the Dutch Bronze Cross, and Mentioned in dispatches, for this event.

On April 12, 1945, No. 7 Troop of 'B' Squadron liberated Camp Westerbork, a transit camp built to accommodate Jews, Romani people and other people arrested by the Nazi authorities prior to their being sent into the concentration camp system. Bedum, entered on April 17, 1945, was just one of many Dutch towns liberated by elements of 8 Recce in the final month of the war.

8 Recce's last two major engagements were the Battle of Groningen over April 13–16 and the Battle of Oldenburg, in Germany, over April 27 to May 4.  Three members of 8 Recce were killed on May 4, just four days before VE Day, when their armoured car was struck by a shell.

During the war 79 men were killed outright in action while serving in 8 Recce, and a further 27 men died of wounds.

Battle honours 

The battle honours of 8 Recce are as follows. The battle honours in small capitals were awarded for participation in large operations and campaigns, while those in lowercase indicate honours granted for more specific battles. Battle honours in bold type are emblazoned on the regimental guidon.
 (July 6–18, 1944)
 (August 7–22, 1944)
Falaise Road (August 7–9, 1944)
Clair Tizon (August 11 and 13, 1944)
The Laison (August 14–17, 1944)
The Seine, 1944 (August 25–28, 1944)
Antwerp–Turnhout Canal (September 24–29, 1944)
 (October 1 – November 8, 1944)
Woensdrecht (October 1–27, 1944)
South Beveland (October 24–31, 1944)
 (February 8 – March 10, 1945)
Twente Canal (April 2–4, 1945)
Groningen (April 13–16, 1945)
Oldenburg (April 27 – May 4, 1945)

Postwar history 

8 Recce was deactivated in Swift Current on December 15, 1945, but after the war it continued to function as a militia regiment. The regiment was redesignated the 8th Armoured Car Regiment (14th Canadian Hussars) in 1947, and renamed again the 14th Canadian Hussars in 1958. In 1968 the militia regiment was essentially disbanded when it was moved to the Supplementary Order of Battle as part of a major reorganization of the Canadian Forces.

Lineage of the 14th Canadian Hussars:

See also 

 4th Reconnaissance Regiment (4th Princess Louise Dragoon Guards)
 7th Reconnaissance Regiment (17th Duke of York's Royal Canadian Hussars)
 3rd Armoured Reconnaissance Regiment (The Governor General's Horse Guards)
 29th Armoured Reconnaissance Regiment (The South Alberta Regiment)
 The Reconnaissance Corps of the British Army

Notes

References 

Official War Diary: Government of Canada War Archives. Copy available from Chris LaBossiere.
Alway, B. M.: "Battle History of the Regiment: 14 Cdn Hussars", 8th Cdn Recce Association, Victoria, BC, 1993.
Copp, Terry: "Cindarella Army: The Canadians in Northwest Europe, 1944–1945", University of Toronto Press, 2006, .
Bell, Kenneth: "The Way We Were", University of Toronto Press, 1988, .
Doherty, Richard: "Only the Enemy in Front (Every Other Beggar Behind...) The Recce Corps at War 1940–1946", Tom Donovan Publishing Ltd., London, England, 1994, .
Doherty, Richard: "The British Reconnaissance Corps in World War II", Osprey Publishing Ltd., Oxford, England, 2007, .
Gooderson, Ian: "Air Power at the Battlefront", Routledge, Oxford, England, 1998, .
Green, R. F.: "A Short History of the 8th Canadian Reconnaissance Regiment (14th Canadian Hussars).  Privately published.
Law, Cecil E.: "Kamp Westerbork: Transit Camp to Eternity: The Liberation Story": The Canadian Peacekeeping Press, 2000. 
Marteinson, John K. et al.: "The Royal Canadian Armoured Corps: An Illustrated History", Robin Brass Studio, 2000, .
Mason, Tom: 8 Recce veteran and Past President of the 8 Recce Association, personal communication concerning the structure and equipment.
Williams, C.D. (ed.): Sabertache: The Memorial Journal of the VIII Recce Association, March 1966.
Zuehlke, Mark: "Terrible Victory: First Canadian Army and the Scheldt Estuary Campaign: September 13 – November 6, 1944", Douglas & McIntyre, 2009, .

External links 
8 Recce History
The 14th Canadian Hussars
Royal Canadian Armoured Corps Association webpage for 8 Recce

14th Canadian Hussars
Armoured regiments of Canada
Hussar regiments of Canada
Military units and formations of Saskatchewan
Armoured regiments & units of Canada in World War II
Military units and formations disestablished in 1945
Military units and formations established in 1941
Swift Current
Supplementary Order of Battle